Nice-Matin is a regional daily French newspaper. The paper covers Nice and the Provence-Alpes-Côte d'Azur region, in south-eastern France.

History and profile
Nice-Matin was created in 1944. The paper was jointly owned by the Groupe Hersant Média and the Groupe Bernard Tapie until July 2013 when the latter reduced its stake to 25% and the former had 75% of the paper. The publisher of  the paper is Hachette Filipacchi Medias, a subsidiary of Lagardère. It is published in broadsheet format.

In 2003 Nice-Matin had a circulation of 267,000 copies. In 2019, Nice-Matin had a circulation of 65,987 copies. In 2020, Nice-Matin had a circulation of 62,881 copies.

References

External links 
 

1944 establishments in France
Publications established in 1944
Daily newspapers published in France
Mass media in Nice